The League of Communists or Communist League is a Finnish Marxist-Leninist political organization. The League of Communists was founded in 14.9.2002 by the Communists who were expelled from the For Peace and Socialism - Communist Workers Party (KTP). The organization was at first known as, plainly, Communists (Kommunistit) but the name was changed to its current form during the registration process.

The dispute in the KTP arose as part of its Central Committee wished the party would join a new electoral alliance party (Forces for Change in Finland [MVS]) in which right-wing organizations were also participating. The majority led by chairman Hannu Harju did not approve of this and the Central Committee voted (18-9) against the initiative. The minority, including the Helsinki district organization, the main force behind the project, chose not to respect the decision, and it was expelled. The expelled Helsinki district later participated in the founding of the MVS. Some notable persons among the expelled were Heikki Männikkö (the party secretary), Reijo Katajaranta (the editor-in-chief of the KTP organ) and Pekka Tiainen (the 1994 presidential candidate). In 2005, the (former) Turku district organization of the KTP joined the League of Communists.
Both parties adhere to traditional orthodox Marxism-Leninism and support, for example,  North Korea as an anti-imperialist bastion. The KTP has, however, chosen not to cooperate with their former comrades who they regard as revisionist traitors. The League of Communists has had to find their allies elsewhere. The MVS was no success and after the general elections of 2003 the league has collaborated with several organizations, like the Communist Party of Finland (SKP) on whose list the League of Communists candidates stood in the elections to European Parliament in 2004. The only elected local councillor of the league, Antti Siika-Aho, stood (in 2004) as a Left Alliance candidate.

As the new organization was set in motion, a newspaper, called Kansan Ääni, was also founded. The  bimonthly paper, the editor-in-chief of which is Reijo Katajaranta, looks very similar to KTP's Työkansan Sanomat. Kansan Ääni is also published by two other organizations controlled by members of the League of Communists. These are the People's Front Against European Union (EUVKr) and Work Against War and Fascism (SFT), the latter of which was founded after World War II by former Communist resistance fighters.

Since its beginning the League of Communists has been led by Kalevi Wahrman whose board includes only men. The organization acts like a political party although it is not officially registered as one, an option which, however, has not been excluded.

See also

External links
 
Statement to the Brother Parties and International Communist Movement (14.6.2002)
Kansan Ääni

Workers Party of Finland
Communist Workers' Party – For Peace and Socialism
Political schisms